Philippe-Auguste Hennequin /filipoˈgyst ɛnˈkɛ̃/ (Lyon, 10 August 1762 – Leuze-en-Hainaut, near Tournai, 12 May 1833) was a French history painter and portraitist.

A student of the Swede Per Eberhard Cogell (1734–1812) in Lyon, then in Paris a student of David, he then went to Rome thanks to an English patron, but was forced to leave the city due to the anti-French riots of 1793. Under the First French Empire he produced large historical compositions, such as A Distribution of the Légion d'Honneur at the Boulogne camp (1806), A Battle of the Pyramids (1806) and the 4m by 6m The Triumph of the French people on 10 August (1799, won the first prize at the Paris Salon that year but was cut up and split between the museums of Rouen, Angers, Le Mans and Caen in 1820). Under the Bourbon Restoration, he went into self-imposed exile in Belgium, where he was director of the Académie de Tournai, though he later died in poverty. Many of his drawings are held at the Musée des Beaux-Arts de Lyon.

References 
 Philippe-Auguste Hennequin, Un peintre sous la Révolution et le Premier Empire. Mémoires de Ph.Aug. Hennequin, écrits par lui-même, réunis et mis en forme par Jenny Hennequin, Paris, 1933.
 Jérémie Benoit, Philippe-Auguste Hennequin 1762-1833, Arthéna, Paris, 1994.

External links 

1762 births
1833 deaths
Artists from Lyon
18th-century French painters
French male painters
19th-century French painters
French portrait painters
Pupils of Jacques-Louis David
19th-century painters of historical subjects
18th-century French male artists